Lucija is Croatian and Slovenian form of female name Lucy.

In Croatia, the name Lucija was the most common feminine given name between 2000 and 2011.

Notable people with the name include:

 Lucija Bešen (born 1998), Croatian handball player
 Lucija Čok (born 1941), Slovene linguist
 Lucija Larisi (born 1975), Slovenian biathlete
 Lucija Lesjak (born 1999), Croatian karateka
 Lucija Mlinar (born 1995), Croatian volleyball player
 Lucija Mori (born 1988), Slovenian footballer
 Lucija Polavder (born 1984), Slovenian judoka
 Dragana Lucija Ratković Aydemir (born 1969), Croatian art historian
 Marija Lucija Stupica (1950–2002), Slovene children's book illustrator
 Lucija Šerbedžija (born 1973), Croatian actor and model
 Lucija Zaninović (born 1987), Croatian taekwondo practitioner

See also
 Lucia (name)
 Luca (feminine given name)
 Luce (name)

References

Croatian feminine given names
Slovene feminine given names